Reims – Prunay Aerodrome  is an airfield serving the city of Reims.

It is a class D aerodrome open to general aviation traffic with no commercial airline service scheduled. Also, it hosts the factory of Reims Aviation.

Facilities
It has one paved runway designated 07/25 which measures .

References

External links
 
 Reims-Prunay Aerodrome Website

Airports in Grand Est
Buildings and structures in Marne (department)